Hayden Catholic High School is in Topeka, Kansas, United States. It is located in the Roman Catholic Archdiocese of Kansas City in Kansas.

Extracurricular activities

Athletics
Athletic teams are called "Wildcats." Hayden won state championships in volleyball, basketball, cross country, golf and football in 2008. In the 2008–09 school year, the Wildcats were state champions in volleyball and girls' golf. The Wildcats, who had been runners-up in the previous year,  defeated Perry-Lecompton High School 42–21 in football, winning their third state championship (two undefeated teams in 1998 and 2004).

Boys' basketball
Hayden has had much success in boys' basketball, winning eight state titles in the Kansas 4A classification. State titles were won in 1982, 1983, 1987, 1990, 1991, 1993, 2008, and 2018.

Notable alumni
 Margaret Thompson Murdock, member of the U.S. Shooting Hall of Fame and the Kansas Sports Hall of Fame; first woman to win a medal in shooting at the Summer Olympics 
 Mark Turgeon, head basketball coach of The University of Maryland

References

External links
 School Website

Roman Catholic Archdiocese of Kansas City in Kansas
Buildings and structures in Topeka, Kansas
Educational institutions established in 1911
Catholic secondary schools in Kansas
Schools in Shawnee County, Kansas
Education in Topeka, Kansas
1911 establishments in Kansas